The 2001–02 NBA season was the Rockets' 35th season in the National Basketball Association, 31st season in the city of Houston, and their 27th and penultimate season at Compaq Center. In the 2001 NBA draft, the Rockets selected Richard Jefferson from the University of Arizona with the 13th pick, but soon traded him to the New Jersey Nets in exchange for top draft pick Eddie Griffin. During the off-season, the team acquired All-Star forward Glen Rice from the New York Knicks, and re-acquired former Rockets forward Kevin Willis from the Milwaukee Bucks.

In their first season without All-Star center Hakeem Olajuwon, the Rockets got off to a 7–5 start, but then suffered a dreadful 15-game losing streak. Rice only played just 20 games due to a knee injury, and Maurice Taylor missed the entire season with a ruptured Achilles tendon. Due to injuries that hindered their roster for parts of the year, the Rockets played mediocre basketball all season long, losing 15 of their final 18 games, and finishing fifth in the Midwest Division with a disappointing 28–54 record.

Team captain Steve Francis averaged 21.6 points, 7.0 rebounds and 6.4 assists per game, and made his first All-Star appearance being selected for the 2002 NBA All-Star Game, but he only played 57 games, and starting 56 of them due to recurring foot injuries and migraines. He also participated in the Slam Dunk Contest. Cuttino Mobley led the team in scoring averaging 21.7 points per game, and Griffin was selected to the NBA All-Rookie Second Team. Following the season, Walt Williams signed as a free agent with the Dallas Mavericks, and Willis signed with the San Antonio Spurs.

Offseason

Draft picks

Roster

Roster Notes
Forward/center Maurice Taylor missed the entire season due to an ruptured Achilles tendon.

Regular season

Season standings

Record vs. opponents

Game log

Player statistics

Season

Awards and records
Eddie Griffin, NBA All-Rookie Team 2nd Team

Transactions

References

See also
2001–02 NBA season

Houston Rockets seasons